= Silver Canyon (Lincoln County, Nevada) =

Valley in Nevada, United States

Coordinates: 37°37′02″N 115°21′31″W

Silver Canyon is a valley in the U.S. state of Nevada.

Silver Canyon was named from deposits of silver ore in the area.
